An unseasonably strong tornado outbreak began on January 7, 2008, and continued for nearly four days across the Central and Southern United States, with the hardest hit area being southwestern Missouri, northwestern Arkansas, and the surrounding area. In addition, a strong supercell in northern Illinois and southeastern Wisconsin produced that region's first January tornadoes since 1967.

More tornadoes occurred across the Mississippi Valley on January 8 and after a break in the activity on January 9, another round of severe weather took place in the Southern United States (primarily Alabama and Mississippi) on January 10. Several damaging tornadoes were reported that day, although no one was killed. A separate, unrelated EF1 tornado also struck the northern suburbs of Vancouver, Washington. In total, over the four-day period, 73 tornadoes were confirmed and four people were killed.

Meteorological synopsis
An unseasonably warm air mass was entrenched over much of central and eastern North America with record highs for much of the region. Several record high temperatures were broken across several states and Canadian provinces from January 7 to January 9 as temperatures rose into the 70s (21–25 °C) as far north as the Ohio Valley with dewpoints in the high 50s and low 60s (14–17 °C) providing additional fuel for storm development.

In addition, many areas near the Great Lakes region reached the mid to upper 60s (17–20 °C) which allowed the northern cells to form, while several areas in southern Ontario and Quebec near the Canada-US border reached near 60 °F (16 °C).

A strong low-pressure area over the central Great Lakes and its associated cold front combined with intense wind shear to provide a favorable environment for supercell development. Despite only moderate instability (which meant only a slight risk of severe weather was issued by the Storm Prediction Center, and only modest probabilities for severe weather at first), supercells developed throughout the day over much of the central US and continued throughout the evening and overnight hours, continuing into the morning of January 8. The hardest-hit area was in the Ozarks, around Springfield, Missouri, where nearly continuous supercells developed throughout the evening, resulting in numerous tornado touchdowns. In addition to the tornadoes, hail larger than baseballs and damaging straight-line downburst winds as strong as 100 mph (160 km/h) were reported. At least three people were killed in Missouri as a result of the tornadoes. Two of these deaths occurred near Marshfield and there were also six injuries.

Strong tornadoes also touched down further north near Chicago and Milwaukee causing extensive damage along the Wisconsin/Illinois border as well as several injuries. Strong cells and lines also formed in Michigan prompting rare tornado warnings across central parts of Lower Michigan. Scattered thunderstorms were reported in Northern, Central and Southern Ontario on the evening of January 7. Tornado watches extended from eastern Oklahoma to southwestern Ontario on January 7.

Activity shifted across the Mid-Mississippi Valley on January 8 where tornado watches were issued across Arkansas and Tennessee and later extended across the Ohio Valley to near Columbus, Ohio and Dayton, Ohio until the early morning hours on January 9. A strong tornado in Pope County, Arkansas killed person and additional tornadoes were reported just west of Memphis. During the day, most of the activity was formed into a line that extended from the Ohio Valley to Alabama although thunderstorm-related wind damage was reported as far north as upstate New York and western Pennsylvania.

After a lull in activity on January 9, a separate system across the Southern United States led to more severe weather, including tornadoes, on January 10. A moderate risk of severe weather was issued by the Storm Prediction Center. Storms developed across Louisiana and Mississippi during the morning and noon periods moving into Alabama with additional storms developing as far north as central and eastern Kentucky where a tornado watch was issued stretching down towards eastern Louisiana and later into Georgia. Multiple strong tornadoes affected Mississippi, Tennessee, and Alabama that evening, including an EF3 tornado that severely damaged the town of Caledonia, Mississippi. More stable air farther east reduced the severe weather potential. In additions to these tornadoes, a rapidly advancing cold front moved into Oregon and Washington generated a severe thunderstorm that produced a damaging EF1 tornado on the north side of Vancouver, Washington on the afternoon of January 10. In addition to the tornado, several funnel clouds were also reported in the area. Wintry weather including snow, sleet and freezing rain on the northern side of the storm was reported from Wisconsin to Maine on January 10–11. Overall, this outbreak sequence killed four people and injured at least 62 others.

Confirmed tornadoes

January 7 event

January 8 event

January 10 event

January 11 event

Non-tornadic events

The storm system was also responsible for heavy flooding rains across much of the Midwest from Michigan to Missouri as well as dense fog across Wisconsin, Ontario and Quebec which was caused by rapid snow melt stemming from the January thaw. flooding was reported across several towns and roads which forced the evacuation of some residents. Record-breaking temperatures were reported all across Southern Ontario and surrounding areas. The thick fog lead to numerous accidents including two pile-ups involving in total 100 vehicles on I-90 near Madison, Wisconsin which killed at least two and injured dozens more while additional fatal accidents occurred elsewhere. It also disrupted air travel across several airports. Rainfall had exceeded locally 4 inches (100 mm) of rain from Missouri to Indiana and Michigan.

High winds and rain have battered Central, southern and eastern Ontario and southern and central Quebec on January 8, and 9. Power outages and wind damages were reported in some areas. As much as 140,000 Hydro One customers were without power in Ontario and at least 100,000 Hydro-Québec customers in Quebec. Winds were gusting in near on in excess of 100 km/h in some localities including the Greater Toronto Area while the highest peak being 133 km/h recorded near Sandbanks Provincial Park in Prince Edward County. One tractor trailer was overturned and nearly fell into the Saint Lawrence River on the Ogdensburg-Prescott International Bridge

See also

 List of North American tornadoes and tornado outbreaks
 List of tornadoes striking downtown areas
 1967 St. Louis tornado outbreak – Similar rare tornado outbreak in January in the Midwest

Notes

References

External links
 Video of a train being derailed by a tornado near Harvard, IL  (YouTube)

F3 tornadoes
Tornadoes of 2008
Tornadoes in Alabama
Tornadoes in Arkansas
Tornadoes in Illinois
Tornadoes in Mississippi
Tornadoes in Missouri
Tornadoes in Wisconsin
2008 natural disasters in the United States
January 2008 events in the United States